Gigantea may refer to:

Genera
Gigantea (alga), a genus of brown algae in the family Laminariaceae
Gigantea (planarian), a genus of planarians in the family Geoplanidae

Species
 C. gigantea (disambiguation)
 D. gigantea (disambiguation)
 E. gigantea (disambiguation)
 G. gigantea (disambiguation)
 M. gigantea (disambiguation)
 P. gigantea (disambiguation)
 R. gigantea (disambiguation)
 S. gigantea (disambiguation)
 T. gigantea (disambiguation)
 V. gigantea (disambiguation)
 W. gigantea (disambiguation)

See also
 List of Latin and Greek words commonly used in systematic names#giganteus